New Ellett is an unincorporated community in Montgomery County, Virginia, United States.

The George Earhart House and Virginian Railway Underpass are listed on the National Register of Historic Places.

References

Unincorporated communities in Montgomery County, Virginia
Unincorporated communities in Virginia